The Korolistskali (alternative name Karolitskhali) is a river by the East coast of the Black Sea,  near Batumi, Georgia.

History
Between 1907 and 1915, during the period of Tsarist Russia, pioneering Russian photographer Sergey Prokudin-Gorsky took a self-portrait on the Korolistskali River - it is one of the earliest colour photographs ever taken.

References

Rivers of Georgia (country)
Geography of Adjara
Tributaries of the Black Sea